Gwahatike (also called Dahating or Gwatike) is a language generally classified in the Warup branch of the Finisterre family of Finisterre–Huon languages. As of 2003, it was spoken by 1570 people in Papua New Guinea. It is spoken in several villages located south of Saidor.

References

Languages of Papua New Guinea
Finisterre languages